The California National Party (abbreviated as CNP) is a secessionist and civic nationalist political party in California. The CNP supports big tent, progressive policies and also campaigns for Californian independence from the United States.

History 
The California National Party was founded in August 2015, with the intent of creating a political platform centered on California's needs and Californian identity.

On 6 January 2016, the California Secretary of State's office sent a memorandum to all 58 county elections offices informing them that they had "received formal notification from the California National Party of their intent to qualify" as a political party on 7 December 2015, and thereafter assigned the party a code designation of "CNP".

Formal organizing for the party did not begin until June 2016, when the CNP held its first convention and elections in Sacramento, California.  At that convention, Theo Slater and Andria Franco were elected as Chair and Vice Chair. Jed Wheeler, founder of Californians for Independence, was elected Secretary as the two groups merged. The CNP adopted a new platform, based on the Californians for Independence platform, in September of that year; and launched a website, mailing list, and recruitment drive. The party re-filed with the Secretary of State in November 2016 and the new leadership was officially recognized shortly after. Since then, Party leadership has been elected annually by the membership. All leadership candidates must reside in California per the bylaws.

The CNP has publicly distanced itself from the Yes California's "Calexit" movement, which has been criticized for its suspected connections to Russia and for the ideology espoused by Yes California. The CNP disavowed Yes California founder Louis J. Marinelli and Yes California's methods of advocating Californian independence. Jed Wheeler, then Secretary of the CNP, stated in an interview with Politico that "Yes California isn't a Californian movement" and that "Yes California is a movement whose optics are all designed for a Russian audience to reinforce Putin", while stressing that the CNP is a progressive Californian party advocating "a raft of progressive policies, ranging from infrastructural upkeep to universal health care".

As of January 2022, 413 California voters have registered as members of the California National Party. To achieve qualified party status, the CNP would need 0.33% of total registered voters, or approximately 73,000 registered voters.

Organization
The California National Party is organized as a general purpose committee with the California Fair Political Practices Commission (California's equivalent of the Federal Election Commission).

Leadership Committee 

 Chairperson: Sean Forbes
 Vice-Chairperson: Yvonne Hargrove
 Secretary: David Lescure
 Treasurer: Lyra Porcasi
 Chapter Coordinator (North California): Bill Skog
 Chapter Coordinator (South California): Chloe Caldasso
 External Communications Coordinator: Theo Slater

Ideology
The party name and central purpose of the California National Party is partly inspired by the Scottish National Party, a social democratic, civic nationalist, center-left party that advocates independence for Scotland. The CNP believes that "California politics should focus on improving the lives of Californians through infrastructure development, encouraging local economic growth, and protecting our land and people".

The CNP's stated "core values" are "building and defending California", "fact-based, compassionate policy", "individual rights and social responsibility", "locally-focused political empowerment", and "prosperity for all Californians"

The CNP supports greater powers and funding control for local government.

Political positions

Civil rights
The California National Party has a platform of increasingly guaranteed inclusivity of historically marginalized and oppressed demographic groups including Women, the LGBT population, First Nationals, and peoples of color. Special attention is given to the socio-economic anchors that limit these groups and policies such as: prevention of violence and abuse, medical and prescription equity, increase criminal penalties for discrimination and denial of services against aforementioned population groups, and creation of Federal reparations programs for the wrongdoings of the United States against marginalized ethnic groups.

Economy

Taxation and Universal Basic Income
The CNP supports a simplified tax code, with a taxation system that combines negative income tax for the most economically vulnerable; a progressive tax on wages, investments, and inheritances above a certain baseline, with a top marginal rate of 50%; a tax on net wealth in excess of $50 million to encourage investment instead of over-accumulation; a 22% corporate tax rate; and monthly universal basic income payments to all California citizens beginning at the age of eighteen or upon legal emancipation.

Under the UBI system proposed, all Californians would receive a monthly amount regardless of income level. In addition to this, the CNP also proposes a negative income tax, under which those Californians with an annual income below $40,000 will receive a guaranteed tax return. Together, these two policies are intended to replace the current social welfare system, to reduce bureaucracy, and save money.

When combined with monthly UBI disbursements of $500, all individuals with California residency would have an annual guaranteed minimum income of $26,000 and an untaxed income from wages and UBI of $46,000. This would be to ensure that food, housing, and other needs are accessible to all Californians. The general increase in the quality of life and the resulting decline in crime, homelessness, and other consequences of poverty will bring benefits to all Californians.

While California remains under the federal tax and welfare system, they propose the immediate enacting of UBI, a tax on inheritances in excess of $1 million, and a tax on net wealth above $50 million, as well as negotiations with the United States to alter California's taxation relationship with the federal government.

California Public Bank
The CNP supports the creation of a state-owned Bank of California. Such a public bank is intended to provide an alternative to high-interest payday loans and check-cashing businesses that charge fees for basic services and are primarily used by people with fewer financial resources. It would also provide access to banking services for industries that are legal in California but remain illegal or over-regulated in the United States.

All California residents would automatically have an account with the California public bank, with the tax refunds and UBI payments directly deposited into these accounts.

In addition to holding California’s reserves of gold and other precious metals, this bank would manage the Innovation and Equity Funds and provide loans and financial services to new, community-based California businesses.

At least one branch will be located in each county which, along with secure electronic banking access, will ensure that all Californians have access to banking services in their local communities.

This bank will be subject to independent audits every 5 years.

California Innovation Fund
The CNP advocates for the creation of an Office of Innovation to administer an Innovation Fund that will provide funding for scientific research and technological development. California will then retain patents on technology created, license those patents to businesses that pay taxes in California at a discount in order to encourage tech companies to locate there. The profits from these patents would then be applied towards an endowment for the fund to help it grow and become self-sustaining over time. The CNP supports funding for such projects as:

Research aimed at improving desalination and clean energy technologies that are critical for California’s long-term resource security.

City and county developed publicly-owned broadband services, designed to be woven together in order to create a California-wide system of public broadband that should seek to be the fastest and most affordable broadband in the world, especially emphasizing increased connectivity in underserved rural areas.

Deployment of autonomous vehicles and any required infrastructure changes, as well as thorough studies that can result in sensible regulations and legislation regarding their use.

Investigating ways to leverage technology to make all levels of California government more responsive, efficient, and democratic.

Education
The CNP supports universal access to education from child-care and primary school to higher education. It advocates that all public schools, colleges, and universities in California should be run by administrations led by educators or former educators with teaching experience, not politicians or third party managers. It supports better hiring and compensation practices for educators.

The CNP platform advocates for access to bilingual education across all California public schools. It promotes the goal of bilingual fluency among all Californians, facilitated by official bilingualism in education between English and Spanish. It similarly supports greater access to foreign language education to promote greater levels of language education, as well as subsidization of foreign-exchange programs.

Primary education
The CNP supports free, universal access to pre-kindergarten and kindergarten education, advocating the expansion of California public schools to include pre-k and kindergarten. The party platform supports the inclusion of "California studies" in all levels of public education, covering topics including California's history, geography, peoples, and cultures; in addition to greater funding of teacher salaries from the Californian government and supports creation of career programs to attract high performing teachers.

Higher education
The CNP advocates that California Community Colleges (CCC) should be free for all Californians and guaranteed offers of admission for all Californians to the California State Universities (CSU) and to the University of California (UC) for all students who meet their respective entrance requirements.

Environment
The CNP supports expansion of the California cap-and-trade carbon market. It also supports investment into infrastructure along the California coast to minimize the effects of sea level rise.

It supports the expansion of the California State Parks, to include both recreational parks and conservationist reserves.

The CNP attributes a failing PG&E as a major threat to environmental and public safety. As such, it advocates for mandates to increase building efficiencies and creation of localized renewable energy production.

Water and Agriculture 
Protection of littoral and inland waterways is a key component of the CNP's environmental plank. It supports a permanent moratorium on offshore drilling along California's coastal seas. The CNP also supports universal public access to all of the beaches of California, based on the freedom to roam principle established when California was under Spanish law. The issue of water access and agriculture are in complement to their beliefs on climate change. The CNP believes in supporting farmers who switch to more environmentally sustainable practices as well as pushing back against large corporate agriculture. Incentives for urban rain and gray-water collection to offset water needed for agriculture is also advocated for.

Healthcare
The CNP advocates simplifying currently existing programs into a "Medi-Cal for all" system, which includes expansion of access and automatic enrollment.

Housing and infrastructure
The CNP proposes a constitutional amendment to enshrine affordable housing as a civil right. This is aimed to incentivize construction of housing where demand is highest, with state subsidization if need be. Additionally, the CNP believes California should learn from housing policies that have been effective in other cities, states, and nations; in particular, Singapore with the promotion of large scale government-funded housing construction, and Tokyo which has had success with substantial liberalization of zoning laws.

The California National Party supports the expansion of statewide transportation and consolidation of local transit agencies for streamlining efficiency and interconnectivity.

Immigration
The CNP platform proposes the Californian government take a greater role in the attraction of immigrants to California, whether for work, study, or residence. It supports the right of California to participate in the issuance of visas for immigrants alongside the U.S. federal government. It also proposes that the Californian government enact a strategic plan for immigration to California.

The CNP advocates the access of all public services as a right of all California residents, regardless of immigration status.

The party opposes the construction of the "Trump wall" along California's southern border with Mexico. It also supports the freedom of movement across the countries of North America.

The CNP's party platform also supports the creation of a guest worker program to allow for fluctuating levels of temporary immigration for labor shortages not met by the local population or other permanent resident immigrants.

Legislative and Electoral Reform

Voting
The CNP supports the adoption of ranked-choice voting for all California-wide candidate elections and will work for its adoption in county and local elections. To ensure the integrity of California elections, the CNP supports hand-counting of paper ballots in smaller counties and municipalities and in larger locations, for circumstances in which hand-counting is not feasible, to exclusively use non-proprietary open-source voting (OSV) platforms with the production of paper ballots on devices that are never connected to any computer network.

California Legislature
The CNP supports a voter-approved amendment to the California Constitution to enact an increase to the size of the Assembly to enable each member to represent, and be more directly accountable to, a smaller group of Californians with shared economic, social, and geographic conditions. Rather than fix a number of members, each member must represent no more than 100,000 people. As of 2020, this would set the number of Assembly members at 396. The amendment would also Increase the size of the California Senate to 50 members, with elections by Party List Proportional Representation, In this system, all Californians would either vote for a party, each of which would produce an ordered list of candidates, or an independent candidate who must receive 2% of the total vote to be seated. Parties would receive one Senator for every 2% of the vote.

Autonomy and Independence
The California National Party (CNP) works for policies that strengthen California while simultaneously laying the groundwork for ever-greater autonomy, self-determination, and ultimately independence.

Elections

2020 
In August 2020, the CNP endorsed Scott Schmidt for Los Rios Community College District Trustee (Area 7). Schmidt won 37% of the vote, but was defeated by opponent Tami Nelson.

2021 

Michael Loebs, then party chairperson, ran as a replacement candidate in the 2021 recall election. Loebs received 25,468 votes, which was 0.35% of the statewide vote. His best performance was in San Francisco, where he garnered 1% of the vote. The CNP considered Loebs's candidacy an overall success, stating that it will continue to endorse "No party preference" candidates and urging members to register more voters.

2022 
The Los Angeles County chapter of the CNP formally endorsed two candidates running in the Long Beach City Council election, Carlos Ovalle for District 7 and Steven Estrada for District 1.

See also
Secession in the United States
Politics of California
Partition and secession in California
California Freedom Coalition
Yes California

References

External links

California secessionism
2015 establishments in California
Political parties in California
Progressive parties in the United States
Secessionist organizations in the United States
Social democratic parties in the United States
Political parties established in 2015
Pro-independence parties